Andreas Bernkop-Schnürch (born in Klagenfurt 6 December 1965) is an Austrian pharmaceutical technologist, scientist, pharmacist, entrepreneur, inventor and professor at the Institute of Pharmacy, University of Innsbruck. His research centers on the areas of pharmaceutical sciences, drug delivery, controlled release, bionanotechnology and polymer engineering. He is the inventor of various technologies such as thiolated polymers (thiomers) and charge converting nanoparticles for mucosal drug delivery. From 2016 to 2018 he served as a member of the Scientific Committee of the Innovative Medicines Initiative (IMI) of the European Union in Brusseles giving advice on scientific priorities to be included in the Strategic Research Agenda for Horizon 2020. Sine 2014 he is on the scientific advisory board of the Nicotine Science Center, Denmark. Andreas Bernkop-Schnürch is the founder of Mucobiomer Biotechnologische Forschungs- und Entwicklungs GmbH (now part of the Croma-Pharma GmbH), Thiomatrix Forschungs- und Beratungs GmbH and Green River Polymers Forschungs und Entwicklungs GmbH. 
He is listed as a Highly Cited Researcher of the Institute of Scientific Information. As of December 2022 his publications have been cited 30,000 times and his H-index is 86

Biography 
Andreas Bernkop-Schnürch descends from a long-established Austrian apothecary family. He was educated in pharmacy at the Institute of Pharmacy (M.Sc.) and in microbiology and genetics at the Institute of Microbiology and Genetics (D.Sc.), University of Vienna, finishing his doctorate in 1994. From 1994 to 1999 he worked as postdoctoral fellow at the Institute of Pharmacy, University of Vienna. In 1999, he applied to qualify as a professor by receiving the "venia docendi" in pharmaceutical technology. In 2003 Andreas Bernkop-Schnürch was appointed to a chair in pharmaceutical technology at the University of Innsbruck. From 2006 to 2013 he served as dean of the Faculty of Chemistry and Pharmacy. Since then he heads the Department of Pharmaceutical Technology.  He is visiting professor at the University of Bari Aldo Moro and member of the senate of the University of Innsbruck. Andreas Bernkop-Schnürch and his wife, Astrid, have three children. His hobbies are golf, mountain biking, tennis and wind- and kitesurfing.

Research 
Andreas Bernkop-Schnürch is a leading scientist of multifunctional polymers in the field of drug delivery, therapy and tissue engineering. He invented and pioneered thiolated polymers – thiomers – as a new generation of bio- and mucoadhesive polymers that are able to form disulfide bonds with cysteine-rich subdomains of endogenous proteins such as mucus glycoproteins or keratins. Various medicines based on thiomers have already successfully passed clinical trials and first products such as for treatment of dry eye syndrome have already reached the global pharmaceutical market. He introduced thiolated polysaccharides as new biopolymers for tissue engineering at the 4th Central European Symposium on Pharmaceutical Technology in Vienna 2001  resulting in numerous products containing thiomers such as thiolated chitosans or thiolated hyaluronic acid. The thiomer-technology paved also the way for the development of thiolated nanoparticles in drug delivery, diagnostics and biosensorics. The likely smallest thiolated nanocarriers for drug delivery are thiolated cyclodextrins that were introduced by him in 2015
providing in particular a prolonged residence time on mucosal membranes. Andreas Bernkop-Schnürch also pioneered charge-converting nanoparticles especially for mucosal drug delivery utilizing the membrane bound enzyme alkaline phosphatase to trigger a shift in zeta potential from negative to positive directly at the epithelium. Cationic nanoparticles are more efficiently taken up by epithelial cells than anionic ones.  However, they do not reach epithelial cells as they are immobilized via ionic interactions in mucus displaying an anionic charge because of sialic acid substructures. Charge converting nanoparticles address this so-called ‘polycation dilemma’ by converting their surface charge to positive at the cellular membrane. Furthermore, Andreas Bernkop-Schnürch contributed substantial basic knowledge to the field of self-emulsifying drug delivery systems (SEDDS) for mucosal delivery of macromolecular drugs.

Awards 
Andreas Bernkop-Schnürch has been awarded more than 20 national and international awards. These include:
 HERBA-Award 1996
 Research-Award of the City of Vienna 1999
 Eurand-Award 2000
 Best of Biotech Award 2001
 MBPW Award 2002
 Best of Biotech Award 2003
 Adventure X Award 2004
 Most Cited Paper Awards 2004 
 Phoenix Science Award for Pharmacy 2005
 :de:Houskapreis Award 2007
 Eurand Award 2007
 Austrian Nano Award 2008
 Ernst Brandl Award 2015
 Most Cited Paper Award 2017 
 Gattefossé North America Award for Excellence in Research & Development with Lipid Excipients 2017
 Phoenix Science Award for Pharmacy 2022

Selected works
He is author of over 500 research articles and reviews as well as editor and (co-)author of several books.

References

External links 
  Institute of Pharmacy, University of Innsbruck
  Interview with Andreas Bernkop-Schnürch: Alternatives to injections (in German)
  Houska Award

Living people
1965 births
University of Vienna alumni
Academic staff of the University of Innsbruck
Austrian biotechnologists
People from Klagenfurt
Austrian inventors
21st-century inventors
Austrian pharmacists